Young Green(s) usually refers to a youth wing of a Green political party or federation thereof, or a youth organisation espousing Green principles.

It may refer to the following organisations (or members thereof):

 Young Greens of Aotearoa New Zealand
 Young Greens of Canada
 Young Greens of England and Wales
 Young Greens (Ireland)
 Young Greens (Italy)
 Young Greens (Sweden)
 Young Greens of the United States
 Young Green (Flanders)
 Federation of Young European Greens
 Global Young Greens
 Young Greens (New Zealand) (formerly associated with Wild Greens)
 Queensland Young Greens (Australia)

See also
 Green Youth (disambiguation)
 :Category:Youth wings of green parties